David Farragut Edwards (c. 1872 – December 6, 1930) was an American football player, coach, and lawyer.  He served for one season each at Ohio State University (1897) and the University of Texas at Austin (1898), compiling a career record of 6–8–1.  Before coaching, Edwards played football at Princeton University.  After his coaching career, he practiced law in his home state of New Jersey, and from 1914 to 1930 he held the office of New Jersey Supervisor of Inheritance Taxes.

Early life and family
Edwards was born in Jersey City, New Jersey.  His older brother was Edward I. Edwards was served as Governor of New Jersey from 1920 to 1923 and in the United States Senate from 1923 to 1929.

Coaching career
In 1897, at Ohio State, Edwards had a 1–7–1 record, the worst in the history of the program.  He was the first Ohio State Buckeyes football coach to face Michigan.  In 1898, Edwards took over at Texas and had a 5–1 record that season.  While at Texas, he unsuccessfully attempted to change the school colors from orange and white to orange and maroon.

Later life
Following the 1898 season, Edwards returned to New Jersey, where he was admitted to the bar in 1901, and practiced law in Jersey City. He served as New Jersey Supervisor of Inheritance Taxes from 1914 until his death in 1930.  Edwards died at the age of 58 on December 7, 1930 of "acute indigestion" in at his home in Spring Lake, New Jersey.

Head coaching record

References

External links
 

Year of birth uncertain
1870s births
1930 deaths
American football fullbacks
Ohio State Buckeyes football coaches
Princeton Tigers football players
Texas Longhorns football coaches
Sportspeople from Jersey City, New Jersey
New Jersey lawyers
Players of American football from Jersey City, New Jersey